Kokhono Megh Kokhono Brishti is a 2003 Bangladeshi film directed by actress Moushumi. It is the first film she directed. It stars Moushumi, Ferdous, Razzak, Bobita, Humayun Faridi and Shahidul Alam Sachchu. Shooting wrapped in August 2003.

Cast
 Moushumi as Nodi
 Ferdous as Shabon
 Razzak as Nodi's brother
 Bobita as Nodi's sister-in-law (brother's wife)
 Humayun Faridi
 Shahidul Alam Sachchu
 Shabon
 Jasmin Parvez
 Shawon
 Shabon
 Priyanka
 Rawshan Ara
 Pranab Ghosh as himself
 Sibli Sadique
 Samsuddin
 Togor
 Shilpi Chokrobarti
 C B Jamal
 Tushar

Music

Kokhono Megh Kokhono Brishti film's music directed by Bangladeshi famous music director Imon Shaha. Lyrics were by Gazi Mazharul Anwar and Mushfiqur Rahman Guljar. Playback singers were Bashir Ahmed, Andrew Kishore, Kanak Chapa, Pappia Sarowar, Sadi Mohammad, Samina Chowdhury and Sabbir Chowdhury. The film has six melodious songs with good scenes shot in Bangladesh.

References

External links
 

2003 films
2000s romance films
Bengali-language Bangladeshi films
Bangladeshi romance films
Films scored by Alauddin Ali
2000s Bengali-language films
2003 directorial debut films
Impress Telefilm films